Chang Chiao-hui (born Chang Shu-ching on 6 August 1972), best known by her stage name Fon Cin, is a Taiwanese actress.

Fon Cin is best known for her roles in many long-running Hokkien-language soap operas like Taiwan Tornado, Sky and Earth Has Affection, Fiery Thunderbolt, The Spirit of Love, Mom's House, Night Market Life. She married Lee Cheng-Chung and they had a daughter (ex-husband's child).

References

External links
 
 

1972 births
Living people
Actresses from New Taipei
21st-century Taiwanese actresses
20th-century Taiwanese actresses
Taiwanese television actresses
Taiwanese television presenters
Taiwanese women television presenters